Events in the year 1912 in China.

Incumbents 
 Emperor: Xuantong Emperor (3rd year)
 President of the Republic of China - Sun Yat-sen until March 10, Yuan Shih-kai
 Vice President of the Republic of China - Feng Guozhang
 Premier of the Republic of China - Tang Shaoyi from March 13 until June 27, Lu Zhengxiang until September 22, Zhao Bingjun

Events

January 

 January 1
The Republic of China was announced to be established.
 Sun Yat-sen elected First Provisional President of the ROC by delegates from independent provinces.

February 

 February 12 – The Manchu Qing Dynasty of China comes to an end after 268 years, with the abdication of Emperor Puyi in favour of the Republic of China.

August 

 August 25 – The Kuomintang, the Chinese nationalist party, was founded.
 August 29 – Flooding in Wenzhou caused by a typhoon kills up to 220,000 people.

Notable births 
 February 2 - Zhu Shenghao, Chinese translator (died 1944)
 February 14 - Nie Er, Chinese musician (died 1935)
 June 27 - Chen Kenmin, Chinese-born Japanese chef (died 1990)
 July 26 - Qigong, Chinese calligrapher, artist, painter, connoisseur and sinologist (died 2005)
 October 27 - C. C. Li, Chinese-American geneticist (died 2003)
 November 14 - Tung-Yen Lin, Chinese structural engineer (died 2003)

Notable deaths
 April 21 - Yung Wing, the first Chinese overseas student (born 1828)

References

 
Republic of China
Years of the 20th century in China